Radiopilot was a German Indie rock band from Berlin.

Background
Formed in 2005 under the name 'Kimono', the band won numerous awards, including the John Lennon Talent Award, and award for pop and rock newcomers in Germany. In 2006, the band changed their name. Their first album, Leben passiert (life happens), was released in 2008 on the Columbia label. The group toured as the opening group for Juli in November 2007 before touring with Moneybrother. Their song "Fahrrad" was featured on the soundtrack for FIFA 09.

"Immer wenn wir träumen" had its debut on May 25, 2009, at German music channel VIVA in the show "NEU" ("NEW"). To improve their chances on the market the video was shot with another version of the song as released on their album Leben passiert.

Since 2010 they have been offering a free song every month on their homepage. With January the first download is called "Lieder über Liebe sind out" ("Songs about love are out").

After having been inactive for a longer time, they officially announced their break-up in June 2013.

Discography

Singles

Albums

Others

References

External links
 Official website 

German pop music groups
Musical groups established in 2005
Musical groups from Berlin